Robert Crow is the name of:

 Bob Crow (1961–2014), trade unionist
 Rob Crow (born 1971), musician
Robert Crow (actor) in Space: Above and Beyond
Robert Crow (WI), in United States House of Representatives elections in Ohio, 2008

See also
Robert Crowe (disambiguation)